Birmingham Civic Society is a voluntary body in Birmingham, England, and is registered with the Civic Trust.

History 

The society was founded at an inaugural meeting on 10 June 1918 in the Birmingham Council House. The first president of the society, the Earl of Plymouth, addressed the assembled aldermen, councillors, architects and other city worthies at that first meeting. He stated the aims of the society, which were:

Sir Gilbert Barling Bt CB CBE was the society's first chairman and William Haywood was the first Secretary. Its principal objectives were the stimulation of historical interest in the city, the preservation of buildings and monuments of historic worth, the prevention of vandalism and the promotion of a sense of beauty and civic pride in the lives of citizens.

Immediately upon its foundation the society received from an anonymous trust the sum of £15,000 (equivalent to around £596,000 in 2016) to buy land for open spaces, the land later to be vested in the Birmingham Corporation. As a result, several areas of land were purchased, transformed into parks and handed over to the City authorities. In most cases the Civic Society has retained until the present the right to be consulted about the management of these parks. Two notable parks in this gift were Kings Norton Park (25 acres in October 1920) and Highbury Park (42 acres in 1923).

From its earliest days the society has taken a prominent role in advising on and lobbying for improvements to the physical development of the city. This has progressed from 1919 when it lobbied for improvements to the (then) village of Northfield right up to the present. Often, the society has commissioned its own plans for developments either at the request of the City Council or on its own initiative. In some cases, such as the refurbishment of the Chamberlain Memorial Fountain in 1978 and the creation of formal gardens in some city parks, it has provided the funding needed to bring about the developments in question.

The society has also taken a number of publishing initiatives. The first of these in 1919 was an illustrated pamphlet on the right use of the City-owned portion of the Lickey Hills, followed by a Guide to Sutton Park, containing a selection of articles and a picture map of the whole park. The Society's most recent publication is its Heritage Buildings Guide, published in 2003 with a distribution of over 500,000 to date.

The cultural life of the city has also benefited from the society's attentions. On its recommendation, the City Council set up an Advisory Art Committee in 1922; it played a critical role in saving the Repertory Theatre from closure in 1924, and again in 1934–35. The link with the Repertory Theatre continues through ex officio membership of the Sir Barry Jackson Trust which holds the shares of the Birmingham Repertory Theatre Ltd. The Centenary Concert for Birmingham Town Hall in 1934 was organised in the manner and form suggested by the society jointly with the City of Birmingham Orchestra.

During the Second World War the society played a pivotal role in saving Edward Burne-Jones' stained glass windows in Birmingham Cathedral from exposure to bomb damage. The Society had them removed and later reinstalled, whilst during the interim, most of the other windows were blown out by heavy bombing. It has worked successfully with the City Council in organising major events; in the 1920s it organised the city's Armistice Day commemorations and more recently this involved being the council's principal partner in celebrating the bi-centenary of the Battle of Trafalgar and the 80th Birthday of Queen Elizabeth.

The Society has played a leading role in preserving the city's statues, especially in the 1950s when many were in danger of being scrapped. Subjects that have been preserved in total or in part (the head being cast as a bust) by the action of the society are Queen Victoria's statue, which was cast in bronze and placed upon a new plinth paid for by the society for the Festival of Britain in 1951; the busts of Josiah Mason; George Dawson and John Skirrow Wright. More recently the society has been involved in raising half of the £30,000 needed for the restoration of the Joseph Sturge memorial at Five Ways and initiated the process for the relocation and restoration of the King Edward VII Memorial, which is now in Centenary Square.
 

Within the wider community, the society has taken a number of significant initiatives. It played a key role in establishing the Consultative Committee (later the Birmingham Council for Community Associations), to foster the development of local community associations and the building of community halls. Currently, it runs two programmes aimed at promoting active citizenship among young people, noting in particular the growing ethnic diversity of the population. The first rewards children who have contributed directly to the improvement of their own local environments. The second involves 1,000 children aged 11 to 14 projecting their lives forward by 20 years, and proposing plans for developments they consider most important for their lives and for those of their children.

The Society operates the city's blue plaque scheme, normally erecting two each year to former eminent citizens. As of 2017, there are 106 plaques around the city.

In 2005 the society adopted a new constitution retaining the spirit of its original objectives, but reflecting the current needs and aspirations of the city and in 2008 the society became the first civic society in the United Kingdom to receive a grant of arms which included a coat of arms and Crest for the sole use of the society and its Officers and a badge to be worn by members.

Awards

The Society makes a number of awards each year in recognition of contributions to the city. These are:

 The Forward Prize is awarded to a project or activity which has enhanced the life of the citizens of Birmingham. Previous recipients are:
 
 
 
 
 
 
 
 
 
 
 
 
 
 
 
 
 
 
 
 
 
 
 
 
 
 The Gold Medal is awarded occasionally to an individual who has made an outstanding personal contribution to some aspect of the life and development of the city. Previous recipients are:
 
 
 
 
 
 
 
 
  (i.e. Geraldine Cadbury)
 
 
 
 
 
 
 
 
 
 
 
 
 
 
 
 
 
 
 
 
 
 
 
 
 
 
 
 
 
 
 
 Silver Medal acknowledges long and dedicated service to the society by its members
 The Renaissance Award was instituted in 2005 to recognise restoration projects of outstanding merit. Previous recipients are:
 
 
 
 
 
 
 
 
 
 
 
 
 
 
 The William Haywood Prize was instituted in the society's centenary year, 2018, to recognise exceptional work in architecture or urban planning in the city.  The first award will be made in 2019.

See also
Civic society

References

Further reading
 The Work of The Birmingham Civic Society 1918–34, William Haywood, Published by Kynoch Press 1934
 The Work of The Birmingham Civic Society 1918–46, William Haywood, Published by Kynoch Press 1946
 A Birmingham Treasure Chest, Tudor Edwards, Published by The Birmingham Civic Society 1955

External links

 The Birmingham Civic Society

1918 establishments in England
Charities based in Birmingham, West Midlands
Clubs and societies in the West Midlands (county)
Culture in Birmingham, West Midlands
Heritage organisations in England
History of Birmingham, West Midlands
Organisations based in Birmingham, West Midlands
Civic societies in the United Kingdom